The following is a list of notable deaths in May 1966.

Entries for each day are listed alphabetically by surname. A typical entry lists information in the following sequence:
 Name, age, country of citizenship at birth, subsequent country of citizenship (if applicable), reason for notability, cause of death (if known), and reference.

May 1966

1 
 Albert Arnal, Valencian pilotari (b. 1913)
 Lee Tung Foo, American actor (b. 1875)
 Harold A. Henry, American newspaper publisher and politician (b. 1895)

2 
 Bill Amery, Australian rules footballer (b. 1894)
 Bernice Fisher, American civil rights activist (b. 1916)
 Agostinho Fortes Filho, Brazilian footballer (b. 1901)
 Egbert Cornelis Nicolaas van Hoepen, Dutch paleontologist (b. 1884)
 Percy Kahn, English pianist and composer (b. 1880)
 Torsten Kumfeldt, Swedish water polo player, medalist at the 1908, 1912 and 1920 Summer Olympics  (b. 1886)
 Jack London, Guyana-born British athlete, bronze medalist at the 1928 Summer Olympics (b. 1905)

3 
 Alan Don, English Anglican priest, Dean of Westminster during Elizabeth II's coronation (b. 1885)
 John Gaddy, American baseball player (b. 1914)
 George Lomer, Australian rules footballer (b. 1904)

4 
 Mick Anthony, Australian rules footballer (b. 1894)
 Timothy Bevington, English and Canadian cricketer (b. 1881)
 Wojciech Brydziński, Polish actor (b. 1877)
 Bob Elliott, American baseball player (b. 1916)
 Atulkrishna Ghosh, Indian revolutionary (b. 1890)
 Adam Królikiewicz, Polish horseman, bronze medalist at the 1924 Summer Olympics (b. 1894)

5 
 S. K. Gurunathan, Indian sports journalist (b. 1908)
 George Racey Jordan, American military officer (b. 1898)
 Josiah K. Lilly Jr., American businessman (b. 1893)

6

7 
 Lucy Grant Cannon, American religious leader (b. 1880) 
 Hamilton Corbett, American football player (b. 1888)
 Leonard Deadwyler, American killed by police (b. c. 1941)
 Carlos Luis Fallas, Costa Rican writer (b. 1909)
 Walter Sherman Gifford, American corporate executive (AT&T) and diplomat (ambassador to the United Kingdom) (b. 1885)
 Stanisław Jerzy Lec, Polish poet (b. 1909)

8 
 Stefan Anderson, Swedish industrialist, journalist and watchmaker (b. 1878)
 Elisha T. Barrett, American politician from New York, member of the New York State Assembly and New York State Senate (b. 1902)
 Harry Anson Finney, American professor of accounting (b. 1886)
 Joseph Anthony Gray, American politician, member of the United States House of Representatives from Pennsylvania (b. 1884)
 Cam Malfroy, New Zealand tennis player (b. 1909)
 Erich Pommer, German film producer (b. 1889)

9 
 Flame Delhi, American baseball player (b. 1892)
 Daniel O. Hastings, American politician, U.S. Senator from Delaware (b. 1874)

10 
 Erich Engel, German film and theatre director (b. 1891)
 Antonio Magarotto, Italian educator (b. 1891)

11 
 Hilary A. Bush, American politician, Lieutenant Governor of Missouri (b. 1905)
 Sir Herbert Butcher, 1st Baronet, English politician, MP (b. 1901)
 John James Carrick, American-born Canadian politician, member of the House of Commons (b. 1873) 
 Henry S. Caulfield, American politician, Governor of Missouri (b. 1873)
 Rolf Hofmo, Norwegian politician (b. 1898)
 Thomas Hughes Jones, Welsh poet (b. 1895)
 Alfred Wintle, British army officer and eccentric (b. 1897)

12 
 Stephen Campbell, Guyanese politician, MP (b. 1897)
 Bruce Eddis, English cricketer (b. 1883)
 Anna Langfus, Polish-French author (b. 1920)
 Sadie Macdonald, Australian-born New Zealand nurse (b. 1886)

13 
 Henrik Adam Due, American-born Norwegian violinist (b. 1891)

14 
 Joseph Williams Armstrong, English footballer (b. 1892)
 Tom Connolly, American baseball player (b. 1892)
 Irv Constantine, American football player (b. 1907)
 Georgia Douglas Johnson, American poet (b. 1880)

15 
 Kathryn Forbes, American writer (b. 1908)
 Maximiliano Hernández Martínez, President of El Salvador (assassinated) (b. 1882)
 Fritz Jack, German fencer at the 1908, 1912 and 1928 Summer Olympics (b. 1879)
 Titien Sumarni, Indonesian actress (b. 1932)

16 
 Adm. William Carr, English-born Australian admiral (b. 1883)
 Eddie Casey, American football player and coach (b. 1894)
 Gen. Merritt B. Curtis, American brigadier general and politician (b. 1892)
 Robert Willard Hodgson, American academic (b. 1893)
 Albert Jelley, New Zealand cricket umpire (b. 1894)
 Johnny MacGregor, Australian rules footballer (b. 1889)

17 
 Vahram Alazan, Soviet Armenian poet, writer and public activist, the First Secretary of the Writers Union of Armenia from 1933 to 1936 (b. 1903)
 Deng Tuo, Chinese writer (b. c. 1911)
 Thomas Harper Goodspeed, American botanist (b. 1887)
 Olav Kjelbotn, Norwegian cross-country skier, competed at the 1928 Winter Olympics (b. 1898)

18 
 Paul Althaus, German Lutheran theologian (b. 1888)
 Punk Berryman, American football player and coach (b. 1892)
 Paul Joseph Chartier, Canadian would-be bomber of the House of Commons (b. 1921)
Lee Gooch, American baseball player (b. 1890).
 Panchanan Maheshwari, Indian botanist (b. 1904)
 Korokī Mahuta, New Zealand Māori King (b. 1906_

19 
 Theodore F. Green, American politician, Governor of Rhode Island and United States Senator (b. 1867)
 Horrie Jose, Australian rules footballer (b. 1893)

20 
 Hester Adrian, Baroness Adrian, British mental health worker (b. 1899)
 Carlos Arruza, nicknamed "El Ciclón" ("the cyclone"), Mexican bullfighter (b. 1920)
 Ermin Garcia, Filipino journalist (b. 1921)

21 
 Henry Balding Lewis, American general during World War II (b. 1889)
 Lady Dorothy Macmillan, British wife of the prime minister (b. 1900)

22 
 John Byers, American architect (b. 1875)
 William Dickson, English-born Australian politician (b. 1893)
 Tom Goddard, English cricketer (b. 1900)
 Arnold Hauser, American baseball player (b. 1888)
 Charles Alvin Jones, American judge, federal appeals judge and Chief Justice of the Supreme Court of Pennsylvania (b. 1887)

23 
 Charles Brand, American politician, U.S. Representative from Ohio (b. 1871)
 Sam Cooke, Australian rules footballer (b. 1883)
 Hubert Creekmore, American poet and author (b. 1907)
 Louis-Charles Damais, French Orientalist (b. 1911)
 Demchugdongrub, Mongolian politician (b. 1902)
 Dimitrios Geraniotis, Greek artist (b. 1871)
 Jacko Heaslip, Irish cricketer (b. 1899)
 Lazarus Joseph, American politician, member of the New York State Senate (b. 1891)

24 
 Henri Barbé, French Communist and collaborator with Nazi Germany (b. 1902)
 Jim Barnes, English golf champion (b. 1886)
 Pierre de Lagarde Boal, American diplomat, U.S. Ambassador to Nicaragua and to Bolivia (b. 1895)
 Alexandru Cazaban, Romanian writer (b. 1872)
 Sir Herbert Dowbiggin, British Inspector General of Police of Ceylon (b. 1880)
 Emil Fahrenkamp, German architect (b. 1885)
 Niaz Fatehpuri, Indian-born Pakistani writer (b. 1884)
 Ove Frederiksen, Danish tennis player, competed at the 1912 Summer Olympics (b. 1884)
 Theresa Garnett, British suffragist (b. 1888)
 Hans Hansen, German architect (b. 1889)
 Gen. Nawab Sir Sadeq Mohammad Khan V, Nawab of Bahawalpur State (b. 1904)

25 
 William Acorn, Canadian automobile dealer and politician; member of the Legislative Assembly of Prince Edward Island (b. 1915)
 André Baugé, French opera and operetta singer and film actor (b. 1893)
 Salvatore Cioffi, a.k.a. Lokanatha, Italian Buddhist missionary (b. 1897) 
 Fred Jones, New Zealand politician, Minister of Defence during World War II (b. 1884)
 Vernon Sturdee, Australian general (b. 1890)

26 
 Don Castle, American actor (b. 1917)
 Elizabeth Dilling, American anti-communist and antisemitic activist (b. 1894)
 Edmond T. Gréville, French film director and screenwriter (b. 1906)

27 
 Vic Buchanan, Australian rules footballer (b. 1899)
 Herbert Körner, German cinematographer (b. 1902)

28 
 Simon Ericsson, Swedish rower, competed in the 1912 Summer Olympics (b. 1886)
 George Garrett, British labour activist (b. 1896)
 Harry Haraldsen, Norwegian cyclist and speed skater, competed in the 1936 Summer Olympics and the 1936 Winter Olympics (b. 1911)
 Edward Harrington, Australian poet (b. 1895)

29 
 James Woolf, British film producer (b. 1919)
 Ignace Lepp, Estonian-born French priest and writer (b. 1909)
 Duncan Alexander Eliott Mackintosh, Scottish clan chief (b. 1884)

30 
 Wäinö Aaltonen, Finnish artist and sculptor (b. 1894)
 Vladimir Alafuzov, Soviet admiral (b. 1901)
 Oscar Walter Cisek, Romanian writer (b. 1897)
 Christian Mahler, German Communist activist (b. 1905)

31 
 Gen. William H. Blanchard, United States Air Force general (b. 1916)
 Dorothy Kelly, American actress (b. 1894)

References

1966-05
May 1966 events